The Old Benton—Sardis Road Bridge is a historic bridge off Arkansas Highway 183 in Bauxite, Arkansas. The bridge was built in 1919 as part of a project to build a new road connecting Benton to Sardis, which would facilitate the transport of bauxite mined in the area. Unlike other concrete bridges built at that time, this bridge included fieldstone in its guardrails, which provided a decorative aspect as well as perhaps being inexpensive locally. The method of contracting and construction of the road and bridge, involving the establishment of a road improvement district, was an important advance in the means by which roads were built in Arkansas.

The bridge was listed on the National Register of Historic Places in 2007.

See also
National Register of Historic Places listings in Saline County, Arkansas
List of bridges on the National Register of Historic Places in Arkansas

References 

Road bridges on the National Register of Historic Places in Arkansas
Bridges completed in 1919
National Register of Historic Places in Saline County, Arkansas
Concrete bridges in the United States
Bauxite, Arkansas
1919 establishments in Arkansas